Magomed Musayevich Adiyev (born 30 June 1977) is a Russian football coach and a former player. He is the manager of Kazakhstan.

Coaching career
On 14 November 2019, he signed a 1.5-year contract with Russian Football National League club FC Chayka Peschanokopskoye. He left Chayka by mutual consent on 5 February 2021.

On 16 April 2021, Shakhter Karagandy announced Adiyev as their new Head Coach.

On 6 May 2022, was appointed head coach of the Kazakhstan national team. In November 2022, the contract was extended for another 2 years.

Managerial Statistics

References

External links
  Player page on the official FC Terek Grozny website
 

1977 births
Living people
Russian footballers
Russia under-21 international footballers
Sportspeople from Grozny
Association football forwards
Russian expatriate footballers
Expatriate footballers in Ukraine
Expatriate footballers in Kazakhstan
FC Anzhi Makhachkala players
PFC CSKA Moscow players
FC Sokol Saratov players
FC Akhmat Grozny players
FC Angusht Nazran players
FC Kryvbas Kryvyi Rih players
Russian Premier League players
Ukrainian Premier League players
Russian expatriate sportspeople in Kazakhstan
FC Nizhny Novgorod (2007) players
FC Zhenis Astana players
Russian football managers
FC Anzhi Makhachkala managers
Russian Premier League managers
FC Shakhter Karagandy managers
Russian expatriate football managers
Expatriate football managers in Kazakhstan
Kazakhstan national football team managers
FC Spartak-2 Moscow players